The Central Leading Group on Hong Kong and Macau Affairs is an internal policy coordination group of the Central Committee of the Chinese Communist Party (CCP), reporting to the CCP Politburo, in charge of supervising and coordinating Beijing's policy towards the Special Administrative Regions of Hong Kong and Macau. The Group is the highest de facto body for China's policy towards Hong Kong and Macau.

The General Office for the group is also known as the Hong Kong and Macau Affairs Office.

History
The Group was established as the Central Coordination Group for Hong Kong and Macau Affairs on 17 August 1978 though an informal Hong Kong-Macau affairs group had formed much earlier. Its founding memo described the group's aim as "seek truth from facts, approach things appropriately according to the situation, do not assume what works in the mainland will work elsewhere, be flexible."

In order to deal with increasingly serious July 1 marches in Hong Kong in 2003, then Politburo Standing Committee (PSC) member and Vice President Zeng Qinghong became leader of the group that year, and China's policy towards the SARs underwent significant reforms. Most notably, the group enacted the Mainland and Hong Kong Closer Economic Partnership Arrangement (CEPA) and the Mainland and Macau Closer Economic Partnership Arrangement, preferential trade agreements, and the Individual Visit Scheme, which allowed mainlanders to visit Hong Kong and Macau on an individual basis without having to apply for group visas or go through officially approved tour groups. Since 2003, the group has always been led by a member of the PSC.

In 2020, in the context of the 2019–20 Hong Kong protests, the group was upgraded from a Central Coordination Group to a Central Leading Group.

List of Leaders
 Zeng Qinghong (2003–2007)
 Xi Jinping (2007–2012)
 Zhang Dejiang (2012–2018)
 Han Zheng (2018–present)

Current composition
 Leader
 Han Zheng, CCP Politburo Standing Committee member, First Vice-Premier of the State Council

 Deputy Leaders
 Xia Baolong, Director of the Hong Kong and Macau Affairs Office
 Zhao Kezhi, Minister of Public Security

 Members
 Yang Jiechi, CCP Politburo member, Director of the Central Foreign Affairs Commission Office
 Li Xi, CCP Politburo member, Party Secretary of Guangdong
 Zhang Xiaoming, deputy director of the Hong Kong and Macau Affairs Office
 You Quan, CCP Secretariat member, Head of the CCP United Front Work Department
 Luo Huining, Director of the Central Government Liaison Office in Hong Kong
 Fu Ziying, Director of the Central Government Liaison Office in Macau

See also

 Hong Kong and Macau Affairs Office
 Central Leading Group for Taiwan Affairs

References

Politburo of the Chinese Communist Party
Leading groups of the Chinese Communist Party
1978 establishments in China
Organizations established in 1978